is a Prefectural Natural Park in eastern Hyōgo Prefecture, Japan. Established in 1957, the park spans the municipalities of Sasayama and Tamba.

See also
 National Parks of Japan

References

Parks and gardens in Hyōgo Prefecture
Protected areas established in 1957
1957 establishments in Japan